A tortilla press is a traditional device with a pair of flat round surfaces of about 8-inch plus to crush balls of corn dough in order to obtain round corn tortillas or flour tortillas. Tortillas are pressed out between sheets of plastic or corn leaves. Tortilla presses are usually made of cast iron, cast aluminium or wood.

Maintenance and Use 
Traditional tortilla presses require the presence of plastic wrap or wax paper or butter paper under and above the dough to prevent the dough from sticking to the surface of the press. However, many modern tortilla presses have addressed this by offering an easy to maintain non-stick surface. Unlike non-stick surfaces of your cookware, these require the application of oil (mineral oil for wood, as vegetable oil will go rancid) on the surface after use, in a process known as seasoning, maintaining the surface and at the same time allowing easy and direct use the next time it is used. Traditional tortilla presses do not need to be cleaned as the dough never touches the surface of the press. But when it comes to cleaning modern presses, some come with dishwasher safe faces that can be detached, while the others need to washed manually.

The amount of force you require to produce a tortilla depends a lot on the machine being used and the thickness of the desired tortilla. In some instances, a lot of force is required, especially when using tortilla presses constructed with lighter materials such as Aluminum. But, the amount of force required is a lot lower than rolling them out with a rolling pin.

General Steps to Using a Tortilla Press 
 Use ground corn or corn flour to make the dough, traditionally called masa.
 Cut two squares of wax paper and place one on the face of the press.
 Place the dough on the wax paper and another piece of wax paper on top of the dough.
 Using the handle to bring the other face of the press onto the dough ensuring the wax paper stays in place.
 Force the handle closed, pressing until the dough is flattened to the desired thickness. You may have to open and reorient the dough to get the perfect circle. 
The steps vary with modern machines where there is no need of wax paper or other insulating materials.

References

Cookware and bakeware
Tortilla